The Permanent Representative of the United Kingdom to the European Union was the United Kingdom's foremost diplomatic representative to the European Union, and head of the United Kingdom Representation to the European Union (UKREP), while the United Kingdom was a member state of the European Union. Their official title was Her Britannic Majesty's Permanent Representative to the European Union. Since the UK left the EU on 31 January 2020, the role was replaced with the British Ambassador to the European Union.

List of heads of mission

Permanent representatives to the European Communities
1973–1975: Sir Michael Palliser
1975–1979: Sir Donald Maitland
1979–1985: Sir Michael Butler
1985–1990: Sir David Hannay
1990–1992: Sir John Kerr

Permanent representatives to the European Union
1992–1995: Sir John Kerr
1995–2000: Sir Stephen Wall
2000–2003: Sir Nigel Sheinwald
2003–2007: Sir John Grant
2007–2012: Sir Kim Darroch
2012–2013: Sir Jon Cunliffe
2013–2017: Sir Ivan Rogers

2017–2020: Sir Tim Barrow

References

External links 
UK Permanent Representative to the European Union, gov.uk
Permanent Representation of the United Kingdom, EU Who is who
Europa (EU official website) - UK - Brexit

European Union
 
United Kingdom
United Kingdom and the European Union